The Port Henry Fire Department Building is a historic fire station located at Port Henry in Essex County, New York.  It was built in 1883 and is a two-story square, brick building with a flat roof sheathed in asphalt.  It features round arches, recessed panels, and decorative corbelling in the Romanesque style.  It ceased being used as a fire station in 1970.

It was listed on the National Register of Historic Places in 1995.

References

Fire stations on the National Register of Historic Places in New York (state)
Romanesque Revival architecture in New York (state)
Fire stations completed in 1883
Government buildings completed in 1883
Defunct fire stations in New York (state)
Buildings and structures in Essex County, New York
National Register of Historic Places in Essex County, New York